Joachim Winkelhock (born 24 October 1960) is a German motor racing driver.

The younger brother of the late Manfred Winkelhock, Winkelhock was born in Waiblingen, near Stuttgart. The youngest brother, Thomas Winkelhock, and Manfred's son Markus Winkelhock are also racing drivers.

Career
After the death of his brother interrupted his career in 1985, he resumed later on, winning the 1988 German Formula Three Championship as well as that year's European Cup, at the unusually late age of 28. The next year was less successful, as he tried Formula One with the small AGS team. Failing to pre-qualify on 7 occasions, Winkelhock then linked up with BMW Motorsport in touring car racing and the Deutsche Tourenwagen Meisterschaft.

He won the 24 Hours Nürburgring in 1990 and 1991 with a BMW M3 entered by Schnitzer Motorsport.

His first title was the 1993 British Touring Car Championship. There, he was also commonly known as Smokin' Jo, for his cigarette smoking habit.
Winkelhock's next win was the 1994 Asia Pacific Touring Car Championship, and in 1995 he won the German Supertouring Championship (STW). He also triumphed in the 1995 Spa 24 Hours, and the 1994 and 1998 Macau Grand Prix's Guia touring car races. His last success for BMW came at the 1999 24 Hours of Le Mans, which he won driving the BMW V12 LMR prototype run by Schnitzer Motorsport.In 2000, he joined Opel in the new Deutsche Tourenwagen Masters, and in 2003 he announced his retirement from motor racing at the age of 43.

He runs his family's Waiblingen-based truck-crane and towing business, occasionally getting personally involved in recovering crashed trucks.

A special edition of the BMW M5 has been made in honor of Joachim Winkelhock.

A 2005 poll run by Motor Sport magazine voted Winkelhock the 16th greatest touring car driver ever.

Racing record

Complete Formula One results
(key) (Races in bold indicate pole position; races in italics indicate fastest lap)

Complete European Touring Car Championship results

(key) (Races in bold indicate pole position) (Races in italics indicate fastest lap)

Complete Deutsche Tourenwagen Meisterschaft/Masters results
(key) (Races in bold indicate pole position) (Races in italics indicate fastest lap)

Complete World Touring Car Championship results
(key) (Races in bold indicate pole position) (Races in italics indicate fastest lap)

† Not eligible for series points

Complete Italian Touring Car Championship results
(key) (Races in bold indicate pole position) (Races in italics indicate fastest lap)

Complete British Touring Car Championship results
(key) (Races in bold indicate pole position – 1 point awarded all races 1996 only) (Races in italics indicate fastest lap)

Complete Japanese Touring Car Championship results
(key) (Races in bold indicate pole position) (Races in italics indicate fastest lap)

Complete Super Tourenwagen Cup results
(key) (Races in bold indicate pole position) (Races in italics indicate fastest lap)

Complete Asia-Pacific Touring Car Championship results
(key) (Races in bold indicate pole position) (Races in italics indicate fastest lap)

Complete Bathurst 1000 results

24 Hours of Le Mans results

Macau Grand Prix Guia Race results

References

External links

Personal website
Winkelhock at ChicaneF1

1960 births
Living people
People from Waiblingen
Sportspeople from Stuttgart (region)
German racing drivers
German Formula One drivers
German Formula Three Championship drivers
AGS Formula One drivers
British Touring Car Championship drivers
British Touring Car Championship Champions
Deutsche Tourenwagen Masters drivers
Japanese Touring Car Championship drivers
Opel people
24 Hours of Le Mans drivers
24 Hours of Le Mans winning drivers
American Le Mans Series drivers
Racing drivers from Baden-Württemberg
24 Hours of Spa drivers
BMW M drivers
Schnitzer Motorsport drivers
Mercedes-AMG Motorsport drivers
Phoenix Racing drivers
Nürburgring 24 Hours drivers
Porsche Carrera Cup Germany drivers